Thabani Zuke (born 11 September 1998) is a South African professional soccer player who plays as a defender for Lamontville Golden Arrows and the South Africa national team.

Club career
Zuke was born in KwaMakhutha, KwaZulu-Natal. After playing reserve football for Lamontville Golden Arrows, he broke into their first team in 2020.

International career
Zuke was part of the South Africa under-20 squad that won the COSAFA U-20 Challenge Cup, appearing in all of South Africa's matches at the tournament.
He received his first call-up to the South Africa national team for World Cup qualification fixtures against Ethiopia. He appeared as a substitute in both of South Africa's qualifiers against Ethiopia.

Style of play
Zuke can play in multiple positions: centre back, central midfielder and right back.

References

1998 births
Living people
South African soccer players
People from eThekwini Metropolitan Municipality
Soccer players from KwaZulu-Natal
Association football defenders
Lamontville Golden Arrows F.C. players
South African Premier Division players
South Africa international soccer players
South Africa youth international soccer players